SMTH may refer to:

 Send Me To Heaven, a mobile game available from Google Play
 Tsinghua University, a university located in Beijing with specialism in engineering disciplines
 SMTH BBS, an influential bulletin board system in China hosted by Tsinghua University
 SMTH, a term used in British railway signal engineering referring to the Signal Maintenance Testing Handbook, a document maintained by Network Rail
 something, an Internet slang term which originated on Bulletin Board Systems